Weifa is a Norwegian pharmaceutical company headquartered in Oslo with production facilities in Kragerø.

Weifa is one of the world’s largest producers of Metformin hydrochloride and a leading producer of alkaloid opiates. Production facilities follow GMP standards.

History
Weifa was founded by pharmacist Olaf Weider in 1940.

Therapeutic areas
Weifa focuses on three therapeutic areas:
 Pain management
 Diabetes management
 Food supplements

Products
bra!: Evening primrose oil.
Bronkyl: Expectorant effervescent tablet.
Dexyl: Nasal spray.
Fanalgin: Pain reliever and fever reducer with an addition of caffeine.
Ferromax: Iron supplement.
Fluormax: Fluorine supplements.
Ibux: A brand name for ibuprofen.
Ibux Gel: A gel version of Ibux.
Nazamér: Salt water spray.
Nazaren: Salt water nasal spray.
Paracet: A brand name for paracetamol.
Paracetduo: Similar to Paracet with the addition of caffeine for increased pain relief.
Proxan: Brand name for naproxen.
Pyrivir: Relieves symptoms of cold sores.
Samin: Symptom relief in patients with Osteoarthritis.
Tigerbalsam: Heat rub.
Tussin: Cough medicine.
Weifa-C Nypeekstrakt: Vitamin C from rose hip extract.
Weifa C-vitamin brusetabletter: Vitamin C effervescent tablets.
Weifa Kalsium: Calcium supplements.

Active ingredients
Codeine: Used in pain relievers and cough medicine.
Metformin: Used in first-line treatment of diabetes mellitus type 2.
Pholcodine: Used in cough medicine.

Development
With a total of over 99 employees, Weifa is today generating an annual turnover of approximately €40 million (35% of the turnover is achieved internationally). Weifa bases its development on 3 criteria:
 International expansion
 Expertise in pharmaceuticals and fine chemicals
 Partnership agreements

Norway
Weifa has market leadership in pain management products for the Norwegian market, with a portfolio of branded products that includes established brand names such as the Ibux tablets, Paracet tablets and Paralgin Forte tablets. Branded products accounts for approximately 70% of net sales.

Export
Weifa’s leading export markets are Germany and United Kingdom. Besides these two essential export markets, Weifa has a long-standing presence in all the main countries of the European Union, in Eastern Europe, in Africa, in North America, in South America and in Asia.

References

Pharmaceutical companies of Norway
Companies listed on the Oslo Stock Exchange
Pharmaceutical companies established in 1940
Companies based in Oslo
Norwegian brands
Norwegian companies established in 1940